Schottenstein is surname of:
 Schottenstein's, founded in 1917 by Ephraim Schottenstein
 Jay Schottenstein (born 1955), an entrepreneur from Columbus, Ohio; son of Jerome
 Jerome Schottenstein (? - 1992), Jewish American entrepreneur and philanthropist
 Jerome Schottenstein Center
 Schottenstein Stores Corp., Columbus, Ohio, a holding company
 Irving Schottenstein founder of M/I Homes from Columbus, Ohio 
 Gary L. Schottenstein (born 1951), Chairman and CEO of Schottenstein Real Estate Group from Columbus, Ohio; son of Irving 
  (? - 1484, Nürnberg)
  (? - 1526)
 Maximilian "Max" Freiherr Schott von Schottenstein (1836, Ulm - 1917, Schloss Schottenstein)

Schottenstein may also refer to:
 The Schottenstein Talmud

References 

German-language surnames
Jewish surnames
Yiddish-language surnames